Late Night Tales: Hot Chip is a DJ mix album compiled by electronic band Hot Chip under the Night Time Stories label. The album, like others in the series, is composed of songs chosen by the band, songs performed by the band themselves, and a final track that sequences every song into one mix. It has received positive reception.

Track listing
Adapted from Bandcamp release:

Reception
The mix has received generally positive reviews. In a review for AllMusic, Heather Phares wrote that the mix was "by turns cosmic and cozy...a special addition to the series.

References

DJ mix albums
Hot Chip
2020 compilation albums
Hot Chip albums